Air Chief Marshal Sir Anthony Gerald Skingsley,  (19 October 1933 – 15 January 2019) was a senior Royal Air Force commander.

RAF career
Educated at St Bartholomew's School, Newbury, Berkshire and St Catharine's College, Cambridge, Skingsley joined the Royal Air Force in 1955. He became officer commanding No. 214 Squadron in 1972, Station Commander at RAF Laarbruch in 1974 and Assistant Chief of Staff (Air Offensive) at Headquarters Second Tactical Air Force in 1977 before becoming Director of Air Plans at the Ministry of Defence in 1979.

He went on to be Assistant Chief of Staff (Plans and Policy) at SHAPE in 1980, Commandant of the RAF Staff College, Bracknell, in 1983 and Assistant Chief of the Air Staff in 1985. He was then Air Member for Personnel from 1986, Commander-in-Chief of RAF Germany and Second Tactical Air Force from 1987 and Deputy Commander-in-Chief AFCENT from 1989 before retiring in 1992.

Death
Skingsley died on 15 January 2019, aged 85.

Family
In 1957 he married Lilwen Dixon; they have two sons and one daughter.

References

|-

|-
 

|-
 

|-

1933 births
2019 deaths
Knights Grand Cross of the Order of the British Empire
Knights Companion of the Order of the Bath
Royal Air Force air marshals
Alumni of St Catharine's College, Cambridge
People educated at St. Bartholomew's School
Place of birth missing
Place of death missing